Amine Dehydrogenase, also known as methylamine dehydrogenase (MADH), is a tryptophan tryptophylquinone-dependent (TTQ-dependent) enzyme that catalyzes the oxidative deamination of a primary amine to an aldehyde and ammonia.  The reaction occurs as follows:

RCH2NH2 + H2O + acceptor → RCHO + NH3 + reduced acceptor

Amine dehydrogenase possesses an α2β2 structure with each smaller β subunit possessing a TTQ protein cofactor.

Amine dehydrogenase, studied in Paracoccus denitrificans, at least transiently forms a ternary complex to catalyze methylamine-dependent cytochrome c-551i reduction.  Within this complex, electrons are transferred from the TTQ cofactor of MADH to the Type 1 copper center of amicyanin, and then to the heme of the cytochrome.

References

External links 
 

EC 1.4.99